The  is an educational foundation in Aichi that operates a university and two colleges in Gifu, Japan.

Institutions
 Gifu University of Medical Science 
 Nakanihon Automotive College 
 College of Naka-nippon Aviation

External links
 Jinno Institute 

School Corporations in Japan
Gifu